Old Wan Chai Police Station, also known as No. 2 Police Station or Eastern Police Station, is a building located at No. 123 Gloucester Road, Wan Chai, Hong Kong.

History
It was built in 1932 on land reclaimed under the Praya East Reclamation Scheme (1921-1929) and faced directly onto Victoria Harbour from the 1930s to the 1960s.

The police station was relocated to Arsenal House Lower Block at 1 Arsenal Street, Wan Chai, in 2010.

Conservation
Previously a Grade III Historic Building, the building became a Grade II Historic Building in December 2009. In 2011, the Development Bureau announced that the former Wan Chai Police Station cum Wan Chai Police Married Quarters site will be partly preserved and partly redeveloped for business and commercial uses.

See also
 Historic police buildings in Hong Kong

References

Buildings and structures completed in 1932
Defunct police stations
Grade II historic buildings in Hong Kong
Police stations in Hong Kong
Wan Chai